Schizopygopsis malacanthus is a species of ray-finned fish endemic to China. It grows to  SL.

References

Schizopygopsis
Taxa named by Solomon Herzenstein
Freshwater fish of China
Endemic fauna of China
Fish described in 1891